Elections to Liverpool City Council were held on 10 June 2004.  The whole council was up for election, with boundary changes since the last election in 2003 reducing the number of seats by nine. The Liberal Democrat party kept overall control of the council.

Election result

Ward results

Abercromby

Anfield

Belle Vale

Central

Childwall

Church

Clubmoor

County

Cressington

Croxteth

Everton

Fazakerley

Greenbank

Kensington & Fairfield

Kirkdale

Knotty Ash

Mossley Hill

Norris Green

Old Swan

Picton

Princes Park

Riverside

St Michaels

Speke-Garston

Tuebrook & Stoneycroft

Warbreck

Wavertree

West Derby

Woolton

Yew Tree

References

2004
2004 English local elections
2000s in Liverpool